The Holy Modal Rounders 2 is the second studio album by the folk duo The Holy Modal Rounders, released in 1965 through Prestige Records.

For the 1965 release the duo's originally track sequencing was changed much to their disapproval. All traditional folk songs were on one side and their experimental ones on the other. The tracks would be returned to their proper sequencing along with two bonus tracks on the 1999 CD re-release.

Track listing

Personnel 

The Holy Modal Rounders
Peter Stampfel – fiddle, banjo, vocals
Steve Weber – guitar, vocals

Additional musicians and production
Don Schlitten – photography, illustration
Larry Schreiber – production
Samuel Charters - production supervision

External links

References 

1965 albums
Prestige Records albums
The Holy Modal Rounders albums